Abir Al-Sahlani (born 18 May 1976) is an Iraqi-born Swedish Member of the European Parliament and since July 2019 a member of the European Parliament, representing the Centre Party. She lives in Hägersten, Stockholm.

Biography 
Al Sahlani was born in Basra, Iraq in 1976 to a middle class Iraqi family. Her father, Faisal Sahlani was a leading opposition politician. He was member of the Communist Party, which at that time, was banned by Saddams Hussein's Baath regime. She left Iraq with her mother, fleeing the brutality of the former regime, leaving behind her father, a political prisoner in Abu Ghraib prison. Al Sahlani arrived in Sweden alone at the age of 15 and began her political career soon afterwards.

Education 
Al-Sahlani studied at the Mid Sweden University (Mittuniversitetet) in Sundsvall. She holds a master's degree from Stockholm University.

In 2002–2003 she was a volunteer with Nacka School (Internationella Engelska Skolan) in Stockholm.

Political career 
In 2004 Al-Sahlani was appointed to the Secretary General of the Iraqi National Democratic Alliance (DNA) position.

In February 2007 Al-Sahlani became a member of Sweden's Center Party. In May 2019, Al-Sahlani was elected to the European Parliament. She has since been serving on the Committee on Employment and Social Affairs. In addition to her committee assignments, she is a member of the European Parliament Intergroup on Disability, the European Parliament Intergroup on LGBT Rights and the European Parliament Intergroup on Seas, Rivers, Islands and Coastal Areas.

Since 2021 Al-Sahlani has been part of the Parliament's delegation to the Conference on the Future of Europe.

Time-out 
In November 2013 Al-Sahlani took a time-out from the Swedish parliament due to alleged deficiencies in the reporting of an aid project in Iraq. According to the Swedish radio 300 000 Euro had not been reported correctly. Half a year later she was cleared from all charges and made a comeback in the Swedish Parliament.

Mahsa Amini protests 
In October 2022, Al-Sahlani cut her hair in the middle of a speech at European Parliament in Strasbourg, France, whilst intoning the popular Kurdish YPJ women's resistance slogan, "Jin, Jiyan, Azadi" in Kurdish which translates to 'woman, life, freedom' to affirm her support for Iranian women and the Mahsa Amini protests and to call on Europe to act.

See also 

 Swedish Iraqis
 List of Iraqis

References

1976 births
Living people
Members of the Riksdag from the Centre Party (Sweden)
Mid Sweden University alumni
Iraqi emigrants to Sweden
MEPs for Sweden 2019–2024
Iraqi politicians
Swedish politicians